HMS Superb was an ironclad battleship designed by Sir Edward Reed for the Ottoman Navy, and was built in Britain by Thames Ironworks under the name of Hamidieh. She had both engines and sails.

Her original design drawings show her as an enlarged  with heavier armament and thicker armour; she was extensively altered from these plans after her purchase, leading to a five-year gap between her launch and her completion. Her poop and forecastle were enlarged, enabling her to carry sixteen ten-inch muzzle-loaders. This was the highest number of heavy guns of uniform calibre ever carried on a British battleship. She also received searchlights, torpedo discharge equipment, extra coal bunkers and extra cabins.

In her original design, the mess deck was unusually lofty. In her conversion an extra deck was added about five feet below the beams, to be used for slinging hammocks. It was always known as the "slave deck".

Although Superb was intended to be able to proceed under sail, and was barque-rigged to this end, it was found that she was unmanageable without power, so no sailing statistics were ever elicited.

Service history
She commissioned at Chatham for service in the Mediterranean on 4 October 1880, and remained on station for seven years. She took part in the bombardment of Alexandria under command of Captain Thomas Le Hunt Ward, where she fired 310 shells of 10-inch calibre at the Egyptian forts. She received ten hits in return, seven of them on her armour, with no casualties.

After reconstruction at Chatham from 1887 to 1891 she was guard ship on the Clyde until 1894, when she paid off into Fleet Reserve. Her only other sea time was at the time of the manoeuvres of 1900. Captain Rosslyn Wemyss was appointed in command on 25 November 1902, serving several months until spring the following year. In 1904 she was used as a hospital overflow ship for infectious cases, until she was sold in 1906.

Gallery

References

Publications
 
 Oscar Parkes, British Battleships  
 Conway, All the World's Fighting Ships  
 D K Brown, Warrior to Dreadnought

External links 
 

 

Battleships of the Royal Navy
Ships built in Leamouth
1875 ships
Victorian-era battleships of the United Kingdom